Glen G. Sorenson (February 29, 1920 – February 26, 1972) was a guard in the National Football League. He played three seasons with the Green Bay Packers.

References

External links

Green Bay Packers players
American football offensive guards
Players of American football from Salt Lake City
Utah State Aggies football players
1920 births
1972 deaths